Lucas Martín Castromán (born 2 October 1980) is a retired Argentine footballer, who played as an attacking midfielder, right midfielder, or right winger.

Career 
Castromán began his professional career with Vélez Sársfield in 1997, with Marcelo Bielsa as a coach.
His consistent performances in midfield awarded him a lucrative transfer to S.S. Lazio in the Italian Serie A, in 2001.
There he became suddenly popular amongst Lazio's fans because of a late equalising goal scored in the very last minute of a derby against cross-city rivals AS Roma that were leading the game 2–1 until then. During his time at Lazio, he was awarded an Italian passport, thus counting as an EU player.

In 2003, he was loaned to fellow Italians Udinese before returning to Vélez in 2004.

Castromán, a firm favourite with the Vélez fans, reinforced his place in the history of the club by helping the team to win the Argentine Primera División Clausura tournament in 2005 after the club's run of 7 years without a trophy. During that tournament, Vélez' coach Miguel Ángel Russo, seeing the team's position of right and left winger were well covered by Jonás Gutiérrez and Marcelo Bravo, used Castromán as a second striker.
Castromán played at great level in his new position, and was the team's topscorer along Rolando Zárate during the aforementioned Clausura tournament. After personal differences with Vélez Sársfield coach, Ricardo La Volpe, Castromán decided it was time to change teams, joining Club América of Mexico.

After only six months with Club América he was transfer listed on 17 December 2007 putting an end to his time with the club where injuries, poor physical condition and poor discipline on and off the field led to his departure. He was loaned to Boca Juniors for US$1,050,000. Though not a first choice player in Boca, he was part of the Apertura 2008 and 2008 Recopa Sudamericana winning teams.

He signed a one-year contract with Racing Club de Avellaneda on 6 February 2009.

National team
Castromán earned 5 caps for Argentina between 2000 and 2005.

National team statistics

Honours
Vélez Sársfield
Argentine Primera División (2): Clausura 1998, Clausura 2005

Boca Juniors
Argentine Primera División (1): Apertura 2008
Recopa Sudamericana (1): 2008

Argentina U-20 national football team
South American Youth Championship (1): 1999

References

External links
  
  
 
 
 

People from Luján, Buenos Aires
Argentine footballers
Argentina international footballers
Argentine expatriate footballers
Argentine people of Italian descent
Argentine people of Spanish descent
Association football midfielders
Club Atlético Vélez Sarsfield footballers
Serie A players
S.S. Lazio players
Udinese Calcio players
Liga MX players
Club América footballers
Boca Juniors footballers
Racing Club de Avellaneda footballers
Sportspeople from Buenos Aires Province
Expatriate footballers in Italy
Expatriate footballers in Mexico
Argentine expatriate sportspeople in Italy
Argentine expatriate sportspeople in Mexico
Citizens of Italy through descent
Italian sportspeople of Argentine descent
Italian people of Spanish descent
1980 births
Living people
Argentine Primera División players
Argentina under-20 international footballers